Dioptis butes is a moth of the family Notodontidae first described by Herbert Druce in 1885. It is found from Costa Rica north to Belize and Veracruz in Mexico.

References

Moths described in 1885
Notodontidae of South America